OOCL Germany is the second G-class built at the Samsung Heavy Industries shipyard in Geoje. She was completed and christened in August 2017 and entered service for OOCL's Asia-Europe trade lane.

Construction
She has a capacity of

Engineering
The main engine of the OOCL Germany is a Wärtsilä-Sulzer RTA96-C, which has an output power of 80,080 kW. The ship operates at a service speed of 22.5 kts, while the maximum speed exceeds 24.0 kts.

References

External links
 OOCL Germany

Merchant ships of Hong Kong
Container ships
Ships of the Orient Overseas Container Line
2017 ships